The bacterial sroH RNA is a non-coding RNA that is 160 nucleotides in length. The function of this family is unknown. An SroH gene deletion strain was shown to be sensitive to cell wall stress.

SroE and SroD were identified in the same bioinformatics search.

References

External links
 

Non-coding RNA